Caesium perchlorate or cesium perchlorate (CsClO4), is a perchlorate of caesium. It forms white crystals, which are sparingly soluble in cold water and ethanol. It dissolves more easily in hot water.

CsClO4 is the second least soluble of the alkali metal perchlorates (after Fr, followed by Rb, K, Li, and Na), a property which may be used for separatory purposes and even for gravimetric analysis.  This low solubility played an important role in the characterization of francium as an alkali metal, as francium perchlorate coprecipitates with caesium perchlorate.

When heated, CsClO4 decomposes to caesium chloride above 250 °C. Like all perchlorates, it is a strong oxidant and may react violently with reducing agents and organic materials, especially at elevated temperatures.

References

External links
 Sigma-Aldrich MSDS

Caesium compounds
Perchlorates